The Kerala Sahitya Akademi Award for Travelogue is an award given every year by the Kerala Sahitya Akademi (Kerala Literary Academy) to Malayalam writers for writing a travelogue of literary merit. It is one of the twelve categories of the Kerala Sahitya Akademi Award.

Awardees

References

Awards established in 1995
Kerala Sahitya Akademi Awards
Malayalam literary awards
Non-fiction literary awards
1995 establishments in Kerala